Castle Rock Township is a township in Dakota County, Minnesota, United States. The population was 1,495 at the 2000 census.

History
Castle Rock Township was organized in 1858, and named for a nearby rock formation.

Geography

Education
The township is served by the following districts and schools:
 Farmington School District
 Randolph School District
 Northfield School District
 Prairie Creek Community School

Demographics

As of the census of 2000, there were 1,495 people, 514 households, and 415 families residing in the township. There were 518 housing units at an average density of 14.5/sq mi (5.6/km2). The racial makeup of the township was 98.19% White, 0.20% African American, 0.27% Asian, 0.40% from other races, and 0.94% from two or more races. Hispanic or Latino of any race were 0.54% of the population.

There were 514 households, out of which 40.7% had children under the age of 18 living with them, 72.0% were married couples living together, 5.6% had a female householder with no husband present, and 19.1% were non-families. 14.2% of all households were made up of individuals, and 4.7% had someone living alone who was 65 years of age or older. The average household size was 2.90 and the average family size was 3.22.

In the township the population was spread out, with 27.4% under the age of 18, 8.0% from 18 to 24, 28.3% from 25 to 44, 28.4% from 45 to 64, and 8.0% who were 65 years of age or older. The median age was 38 years. For every 100 females, there were 108.5 males. For every 100 females age 18 and over, there were 103.8 males.

The median income for a household in the township was $59,479, and the median income for a family was $64,000. Males had a median income of $42,500 versus $28,000 for females. The per capita income for the township was $23,334.  About 4.5% of families and 5.3% of the population were below the poverty line, including 6.6% of those under age 18 and 5.8% of those age 65 or over.

References

External links
 Castle Rock Township, Minnesota – Official Website

Townships in Dakota County, Minnesota
Townships in Minnesota